Kalaavida (Kannada: ಕಲಾವಿದ) is a 1949 Indian Kannada film, directed by and Krishnan and Suryanarayana. Produced by and starring B. Sohanlal in the lead role, it also stars Khantha and Shantha as parallel leads. The film had musical score by P. Kalinga Rao.

Cast
 B. Sohanlal
 Khantha
 Shantha

References

External links
 

1940s Kannada-language films
Indian black-and-white films